Håkan Ståhlbro (born 11 February 1957) is a Swedish curler.

He is a 1980 Swedish men's champion and a 1982 Swedish mixed champion.

Teams

Men's

Mixed

References

External links
 

Living people
1957 births
Swedish male curlers
Swedish curling champions
20th-century Swedish people